The Gaza Governorate, also alternatively known as Gaza City Governorate, is one of the 16 Governorates of Palestine, located in the north central Gaza Strip. Gaza is claimed by the State of Palestine, but the land is under the control of the Hamas, while its border with Israel, airspace and maritime territory are controlled by the Israel Defense Forces. According to the Palestinian Central Bureau of Statistics, the district's population was 505,700 in 2006. All of its seats were won by Hamas members in the 2006 parliamentary elections. It is governed by Mohammed Qadoura.

The governorate consists of one city, three towns and a number of refugee camps.

Localities

Cities
 Gaza City (seat)

Municipal towns
 Al-Zahra

Village councils
 Juhor ad-Dik
 Madinat al-Awda
 Al-Mughraqa (Abu Middein)

Refugee camps
 Al-Shati (camp) (Beach camp)

References

Sources 
 Gaza Governorate Localities

 
Governorates of the Palestinian National Authority in the Gaza Strip